The Ignerents were formed in 1977 in Whitstable, Kent, by brothers Chris and Steve Harris, joined by neighbour Mark Leighton on guitar, vocalist Kevin Holmes and drummer Stan 'Gretsch' Littlejohn. The band were an important part of the local Kent punk scene in the late 1970s in Kent alongside bands like Wild Billy Childish's Pop Rivets, The Names, Naughty Thoughts and The Rivals.

All of the band went to Queen Elizabeth's School in Faversham. The band were managed by a third Harris brother, Phil, who was quick to recruit Ben Challis from another local punk band, The Plague, when Kevin Holmes dropped out as lead singer just before the band's first gig in Whitstable. In its final and most successful lineup (as the Ignerents), the band was a fourpiece consisting of Ben Challis (vocals), Steve Harris (guitar), Chris Harris (base) and Stan Gretsch (drums). The band released one single in 1979 (Radio Interference b/w Wrong Place Wrong Time). The Ignerents also featured on the First Offenders compilation album in 1980 with two tracks, Harbour Street and I Won't Be There. Wrong Place Wrong Time also featured on the German Punk series 'Back To Front'. The band finally evolved into a new band, The Beekeepers, which featured Nick Appleton on guitar alongside Steve and with Chris, Ben and Stan, and then finally with Russel Lax on drums (who, in the then small Kent new wave music scene had, I think, been the Pop Rivets' drummer and ended up as the drummer with local folk heroes the Oysterband!). The Beekeepers released one single, Platform 5 b/w The Trouble With You in 1981.

On the live circuit the Ignerents were active from 1977-1981 with numerous gigs that included the Marquee Club and the Vortex in London and support slots with bands like 999, The Only Ones, Wayne County & The Electric Chairs and Chelsea.

The band's history has been marred by the deaths of Stan, by now drummer with the Rivals, in a road accident in 1981; and Chris, who died in a drowning accident in 1984 whilst on holiday. The band released the Beekeepers single to celebrate Stan's life and played a final tribute gig to celebrate Chris's life at the Tankerton Arms in Whitstable in 1994 and in 1997 released a CD (Woodbines, Tears and Jealousy) which featured all of the Ignerents' previously released tracks and another ten archive tracks.

Various tracks also feature on other compilation albums (see the Discography) including Wrong Place Wrong Time on Back To Front Vol 4 and Call me Irresponsible on Punks, Skins & Rude Boys III.

Discography

1979 Radio Interference B/W Wrong Place Wrong Time
ACE RECORDS/RUNDOWN RECORDS

1980 Harbour Street, I Won't Be There
ON FIRST OFFENDERS, COMPILATION, CRIMINAL RECORDS

1981 Platform 5 B/W The Trouble With You (AS THE BEEKEEPERS)
RUNDOWN RECORDS

1994 Wrong Place Wrong Time
ON BACK TO FRONT VOL IV INCOGNITO RECORDS

1997 WOODBINES, TEARS & JEALOUSY
Radio Interference,
I Won't Be There,
Wrong Place Wrong Time,
Call Me Irresponsible,
Harbour Street,
Commuter Zone,
Rundown,
Black Doctor Martens,
I Like You,
Collector's Item,
You're So Stupid,
Uganda Calling,
The Trouble With You,
Woodbines, Tears & Jealousy
RUNDOWN RECORDS

1997 Radio Interfence, Wrong Place Wrong Time on RAW AND RARE VOL 1
(R+R 001)

2002 Call Me Irresponsible
ON PUNKS, SKINS AN RUDEBOYS NOW VOLUME III, COMPILATION, GARAZ MAGAZINE

In July 2012, Ben Challis reformed a version of the band as the Pig Ignerents with Jord Kewen on bass, Jonah Baldwin on guitar and Heather Britton on drums. Having been booked to play the main stage at the late cancelled 'Last Jubilee' punk festival in Bath on 4 June, The band played the Good Ship in Kilbun on 14 July and Guilfest on 15 July on the Viva le Rock stage headlined by The Undertones, Buzzcocks and The Beat. You can see a video from the Good Ship on YouTube here. In 2014 James Crosley joined the band as drummer and the band became Manchester based. In March the band recorded eight new tracks of 'Ignerents' songs and also in March two major festival dates were confirmed by the Pig Ignerents at the Bazant Pohoda festival in Slovakia and at the Exit Festival in Serbia.

English punk rock groups
Musical groups established in 1977
Musical groups from Kent
People from Whitstable